Beinamar is a small city in Chad. The city is the chef-lieu of the department of Dodjé, in the Logone Occidental Region of south-western Chad.

Populated places in Chad
Logone Occidental Region